The Storm is the second studio album by progressive rock band Karnataka, released by Immrama Records in 2000.

Track listing
All lyrics written by R. Jones, all music written by J. Edwards, I.Jones, and R. Jones.
 "Heaven Can Wait" - 5:15
 "Dreamer" - 3:39
 "The Journey" - 8:25
 "Hay" - 4:30
 "Love and Affection" - 4:42
 "I Should Have Known" - 6:13
 "Everything Must Change" - 5:29
 "Shine" - 4:48
 "Writing on the Wall" - 5:21
 "The Storm" - 8:48

Personnel
 Rachel Jones - lead vocals
 Paul Davies - electric guitars
 Ian Jones - bass, acoustic guitars, bodhran, samples
 Jonathan Edwards - keyboards
 Gavin Griffiths - drums, percussion

Additional personnel
 Peter Davies - Scottish small pipes (10)
 Steve Evans - programming (2 and 3)
 Jenny Hooker - recorder (10)
 Steve Simmons - alto and tenor saxophones (4)

References

2000 albums
Karnataka (band) albums